Taking Chance is a 2009 American historical drama television film directed by Ross Katz, from a screenplay by Michael Strobl and Katz, based on the journal of the same name by Strobl, who also serves as military consultant. Kevin Bacon's portrayal of Strobl in the film won him a Golden Globe Award for Best Actor in a Miniseries or a Motion Picture Made for Television and a Screen Actors Guild Award for Outstanding Performance by a Male Actor in a Miniseries or Television Movie, among other accolades.

Taking Chance premiered at the Sundance Film Festival on January 16, 2009, and aired on HBO in the United States on February 21, 2009. The film received generally favorable reviews from critics. At the 61st Primetime Emmy Awards, it earned ten nominations, including Outstanding Made for Television Movie and Outstanding Lead Actor in a Miniseries or a Movie for Bacon, and won one for Outstanding Single-Camera Picture Editing for a Miniseries or a Movie.

Plot 

The movie is based on the recollections of U.S. Marine Lt. Col Michael Strobl, a real person, who accompanied the remains of Lance Corporal Chance Phelps, a Marine fatally wounded by gunfire near Baghdad during the Iraq War, from Dover Air Force Base to Dubois, Wyoming in April 2004. He attended both Phelps's funeral and his memorial service, and wrote an essay about the entire experience, the emotions he felt and the people he met. It was published in the blog Blackfive on 23 April 2004 and was circulated widely on the Internet.

Cast 

 Kevin Bacon as Lt. Colonel Michael Strobl
 Tom Aldredge as Charlie Fitts
 Nicholas Reese Art as Nate Strobl
 Blanche Baker as Chris Phelps
 Tom Bloom as Navy Chaplain
 Guy Boyd as Gary Hargrove
 James Castanien as Robert Orndoff
 Gordon Clapp as Tom Garrett
 Mike Colter as MGySgt Demetry
 GySgt Henry Coy as Marine Driver
 Joel de la Fuente as Ticketing Agent
 Liza Colón-Zayás as Ticketing Agent
 Ann Dowd as Gretchen
 Tate Ellington as A.V. Scott
 Noah Fleiss as Army Sergeant
 Julian Gamble as Jeff Mack
 Enver Gjokaj as Corporal Arenz ('Sergeant' in film's dialogue)
 Brendan Griffin as Major Thompson
 Sgt Adam Hayes as Dover Team Leader
 Danny Hoch as TSA Agent
 Ruby Jerins as Olivia Strobl
 Tom Kemp as Business Man
 John Bedford Lloyd as General Kruger
 John Magaro as Rich Brewer
 Matthew Morrison as Robert Rouse
 Maximilian Osinski as Sgt Neuman
 Wolé Parks as Major Schott
 Del Pentecost as Minneapolis Cargo Handler
 Dominic Colon as Minneapolis Cargo Handler
 George Rabidou as Marine First Sergeant delivering U.S. Flag to parent during funeral.
 Christina Rouner as Tall Flight Attendant
 Victor Slezak as Sgt Mulcahy
 Felix Solis as Philly Cargo Worker
 Sarah Thompson as Annie
 Paige Turco as Stacey Strobl
 Sharon Washington as Mortuary Technician
 Julie White as Colonel Karen Bell
 Emily Wickersham as Petty Officer Kelley Phelps
 William Wise as Larry Hertzog
 Tom Wopat as John Phelps
 Richard Reed as Rifle detail Staff Non Commissioned Officer

Critical reception 
Taking Chance received generally favorable reviews. It holds a 76 out of 100 rating on Metacritic. Review aggregator Rotten Tomatoes gave it a 57% rating based on reviews from 7 critics.

One review from The Baltimore Sun, said that it "... is one of the most eloquent and socially conscious films the premium cable channel has ever presented," and USA Today, said "A small, almost perfectly realized gem of a movie, Taking Chance is also precisely the kind of movie that TV should be making." On the other end is Slant Magazine, saying "Instead of well-drawn characters or real human drama, we are presented with a military procedural on burial traditions. The film desperately wants the viewer to shed tears for its fallen hero without giving a single dramatic reason to do so."

The film was the most-watched HBO original in five years, with over two million viewers on the opening night, and more than 5.5 million on re-airings. Critics often attribute this success to its apolitical nature, not directly depicting nor offering an opinion of the Iraq War.

Former Secretary of Defense Robert Gates wrote in his 2014 memoir Duty: Memoirs of a Secretary at War that the film had an "important impact" on his decision to allow the media access to the transfer of fallen service members at Dover Air Force Base in February 2009. During a White House press conference in 2017, former White House Chief of Staff and Retired Marine Corps General John F. Kelly, who was next to Chance when he was killed and is the father of First Lieutenant Robert Kelly who was killed in action in Afghanistan, recommended that the Washington press corps watch the film in order to understand the solemnity and dignity of the process of returning fallen military service members to their families.

Awards and nominations

References

External links 
 
 Official website for Taking Chance on HBO
 Arts of War on the Web review, February 20, 2009
 
 Taking PFC Phelps home, by LtCol Michael Strobl, USMC (Ret)
 You're his witness now Marine Corps Times

2009 films
2009 drama films
2009 television films
2000s historical drama films
American films based on actual events
American historical drama films
Drama films based on actual events
American drama television films
Films about American military personnel
Films about funerals
Films about the United States Marine Corps
Films directed by Ross Katz
Films scored by Marcelo Zarvos
Films shot in California
Films shot in Montana
Films shot in New Jersey
Films shot in Newark, New Jersey
HBO Films films
Iraq War films
Television films based on actual events
Television Academy Honors winners
2000s English-language films
2000s American films